There are 250 species of deer fly in the genus Chrysops. Their distribution is worldwide, though they have not been reported in Iceland, Greenland, and Hawaii.

Photos

References

External links
 Penn State University's Deer Fly site

Tabanidae
Brachycera genera
Taxa named by Johann Wilhelm Meigen
Diptera of North America
Diptera of South America
Diptera of Europe
Diptera of Asia
Diptera of Africa

de:Goldaugenbremse
nl:Goudoogdaas